Charavalayam is a 1988 Indian Malayalam film, directed and produced by K. S. Gopalakrishnan. The film stars Innocent, Hari, Santhosh and Baiju in the lead roles. The film has musical score by S. P. Venkatesh.

Cast

Lalu Alex as Jagadhessh
Poojappura Ravi as Kuttan Pilla
Priya as Karumbi
Santhakumari as Asha Ousepechan
Vincent as Chalayil Ousapechan
Captain Raju as Basheer
Innocent as Kumaran
Hari
Santhosh as Karumban
Baiju
Viji

Soundtrack
The music was composed by S. P. Venkatesh and the lyrics were written by Poovachal Khader.

References

External links
 

1988 films
1980s Malayalam-language films
Films directed by K. S. Gopalakrishnan